Armadale Senior High School  is a public co-educational specialist high day school, located on the South Western Highway, in the  suburb of Armadale, Western Australia.

The school provides specialist programs in the areas of academic extension, visual arts, information technology and industry programs.

Overview 
Construction of the school commenced in 1952 and was opened as a District High School in 1953. The school became a senior high school in 1963 and still caters for students in Years 8 to 12. In 2015 Armadale Senior High School welcomed its first cohort of Year 7 students along with all other senior high schools across the state. The transition of year 7 students to high school finally brought Western Australia into line with all other Australian states.

The inaugural Principal was Carl Riedel who managed the school from 1953 to 1956.  The next principal was Bill Walker who served from 1957 to 1959. Mary Griffiths, served the Armadale Senior High School community since 2007 as principal. , the principal was Carol Daniels.

Notable students
Sue Lines, senator

See also

 List of schools in the Perth metropolitan area

References

External links
 Armadale Senior High School

Educational institutions established in 1953
Public high schools in Perth, Western Australia
1953 establishments in Australia
Armadale, Western Australia